Kulik is an Ashkenazi Jewish, Polish and German surname. The Czech-language form, Kulík, is a diminutive of "Mikuláš" ("Nicholas") via "Mikulík". The American spelling of the surname is "Kulick".

Notable people with the surname include:
 Anita Kulik (born 1964), American politician
 Buzz Kulik (1922–1999), American movie director
 Christian Kulik (born 1952), German football player
 Eran Kulik (born 1946), Israeli football manager
 Grigory Kulik (1890–1950), Marshal of the Soviet Union
 Heather Kulik, American computational materials scientist and chemist
 Ilia Kulik (born 1977), Russian figure skater
 Ivan Kulyk (1897–1937; a pen name of Izrail Yudelevych), Soviet poet
 Jakob Philipp Kulik (1793–1863), Austrian mathematician
 Johann Kulik (1800–1872), Czech luthier
 Leonid Kulik (1883–1942), Estonian mineralogist
 Marina Kulik (born 1956), Dutch painter
 Oleg Kulik (born 1961), Ukrainian-born Russian performance artist
 Witold Kulik (born 1957), former Polish football manager
 Zofia Kulik (born 1947), Polish artist

See also

References

Slavic-language surnames
Surnames from given names